La Valette-du-Var (Provençal Occitan: La Valeta) is a commune in the Var department in the Provence-Alpes-Côte d'Azur region in southeastern France.

Population

Notable people 
The village cemetery contains the grave of Joseph Pujol, who died in 1945 and who, under his stage name of "Le Pétomane", was a famous flatulist.

Twin towns – sister cities

La Valette-du-Var is twinned with:
 Bocșa, Romania (1990)
 Krościenko nad Dunajcem, Poland (2005)
 Liévin, France (2001)
 Novocherkassk, Russia (1992)
 Somma Lombardo, Italy (1997)
 Villingen-Schwenningen, Germany (1974)

See also
Communes of the Var department

References

External links
Official website (in French)

Communes of Var (department)